Samuel Leroy Taylor, Jr. (July 12, 1916 – October 5, 1990), known as Sam "The Man" Taylor, was an American jazz, rhythm and blues, and blues tenor saxophonist.

Taylor was born in Lexington, Tennessee, United States. He attended Alabama State University, where he played with the Bama State Collegians. He later worked with Scatman Crothers, Cootie Williams, Lucky Millinder, Cab Calloway, Ray Charles, Buddy Johnson, Louis Jordan and Big Joe Turner. Taylor was one of the most requested session saxophone players in New York recording studios in the 1950s. He also replaced Count Basie as the house bandleader on Alan Freed's radio series, Camel Rock 'n Roll Dance Party, on CBS.

Taylor played the saxophone solo on Turner's "Shake, Rattle and Roll". He also played on "Harlem Nocturne"; on "Money Honey", recorded by Clyde McPhatter and the Drifters in 1953; and on "Sh-Boom" by the Chords.

During the 1960s, he led a five-piece band, the Blues Chasers. In the 1970s, he frequently played and recorded in Japan.

Taylor died in 1990 in Crawford Long Hospital, in Atlanta, Georgia, at the age of 74.

Discography
 Blue Mist (MGM), 1955
 Music with the Big Beat (MGM), 1956
  Out Of This World (MGM), 1956
 Rockin' Sax and Rollin' Organ, with Dick Hyman (MGM), 1957
 Jazz for Commuters (MetroJazz), 1958
 More Blue Mist (MGM), 1959
 Mist of the Orient (MGM) E4066, 1962
 In Japan (MGM) SMM-1019
 The Bad and the Beautiful (Moodsville), 1962
 Misty Mood (Decca), 1962
 It's a Blue World (Decca), 1963
 Watermelon Man, with  Frank Hunter and the Huntsmen (Epic), 1963
 Somewhere in the Night (Decca), 1964
 A Musical Portrait of Ray Charles, with Leroy Holmes and his Orchestra (MGM)
 Love You Tokyo (Crown), GW-7001 C.M.P. Nov. 1967
 Ima Wa Shiawasekai (Crown) GW-7002 C.M.P. Dec. 1968
 Hana to Namida (Crown) GW-7005 Dec. 1969
 Koga Melodies: Best Collection (Pony Canyon), c. 1970
 Eternal Standard (Pony Canyon), c. 1971
 Bokyo Shiretokoryojo (Crown) GW-7015 C.M.P. Nov. 1971
 Hit Melodies From Shi Retoko to Nagasaki (Crown) GW-7055 C.M.P., July 1973
 Onna No Sadame (Crown), GW-7070 C.M.P., Nov. 1974
 The Blue Mood of Sam Taylor (MCA) MCA-9050-511974
 Song of Street (Crown), GW-20051-52, 1975
 Mood Tenor Sax, with Yokouchi Shoji, Kosugi Jinsan Three (Crown), GW-20139-40, 1975
 Sam (The Man) Taylor Vol. 1 (Crown), GW-20239-40, 1978
 Standard Best Collection Vols. I & II (Japan), 1999
 Bluesy Sam Taylor (Polydor), SMP-2004
 Blue Light Yokohama (Polydor), SMP-2043

As sideman
With The Chords 
Sh-Boom (Cat), 1954
With Ruth Brown 
Ruth Brown (Atlantic), 1957
Miss Rhythm (Atlantic), 1959
With Freddy Cole
Waiter, Ask the Man to Play the Blues (Dot), 1964
With Al Hibbler
After the Lights Go Down Low (Atlantic), 1957
With Langston Hughes
Weary Blues (MGM), 1958
With Quincy Jones
The Birth of a Band! (Mercury), 1959
Quincy Plays for Pussycats (Mercury, 1959-65 [1965])

See also
 Harlem Nocturne

References

1916 births
1990 deaths
People from Lexington, Tennessee
American male saxophonists
Jump blues musicians
Jazz-blues saxophonists
Alabama State University alumni
20th-century American saxophonists
20th-century American male musicians
American male jazz musicians